Joyce Mason is a Democratic member of the Illinois House of Representatives for the 61st district. The 61st district, located in northern Lake County, includes all or parts of Zion, Winthrop Harbor, Beach Park, Old Mill Creek, Gurnee and Antioch.

Mason defeated Republican incumbent Sheri Jesiel in the 2018 general election.

Mason, a resident of Gurnee, was Vice President of the Woodland Community Consolidated School District 50 Board of Education at the time of her election to the Illinois House of Representatives. She is a human resources consultant with a master of business administration from the Keller Graduate School of Management and a bachelor of arts in communications from University of Illinois at Chicago.

As of July 3, 2022, Representative Mason is a member of the following Illinois House committees:

 Agriculture & Conservation Committee (HAGC)
 Appropriations - Higher Education Committee (HAPI)
 Elementary & Secondary Education: School Curriculum & Policies Committee (HELM)
 Energy & Environment Committee (HENG)
 Prescription Drug Affordability Committee (HPDA)
 Tourism Committee (SHTO)

Electoral history

References

External links
 Vote Joyce Mason, official campaign website

21st-century American politicians
21st-century American women politicians
DeVry University alumni
Democratic Party members of the Illinois House of Representatives
People from Gurnee, Illinois
University of Illinois Chicago alumni
Women state legislators in Illinois
Year of birth missing (living people)
Living people